Uzbekistan competed at the 2022 World Aquatics Championships in Budapest, Hungary from 17 June to 3 July.

Artistic swimming

Uzbekistan entered three artistic swimmers. Anna Vashchenko did not compete in the duet free routine competition.

Women

Diving

Uzbekistan entered three divers.

Men

Swimming

Uzbekistan entered two swimmers.

Men

References

Nations at the 2022 World Aquatics Championships
Uzbekistan at the World Aquatics Championships
2022 in Uzbekistani sport